Cold Creek Conservation Area, usually Cold Creek, is an ecologically diverse protected Area of Natural and Scientific Interest in south-central Ontario, Canada. The  conservation area was opened on 20 June 1962 by Wilf Spooner and the Toronto and Region Conservation Authority. It is located on the western end of King Township, overlapping the Oak Ridges Moraine. The Government of Ontario Ministry of Natural Resources classifies the area as a provincially significant Area of Natural and Scientific Interest (Life Science) for its "provincially or regionally significant representative ecological features". The area was also a site classified for the International Biological Program. The Life Science area, known as Cold Creek Swamp, is composed of a swamp and forest.

Cold Creek has hiking trails that cover the Oak Ridges Moraine and a boreal peat bog, among others. At least 110 species of birds have been observed at Cold Creek. Nest boxes are distributed throughout the conservation area to house birds and bats.

See also
Ecology of the Oak Ridges Moraine

References

Further reading

Cold Creek Conservation Area Management Plan

External links

Cold Creek Conservation Area website

Natural areas in King, Ontario
Conservation areas in Ontario
Areas of Natural and Scientific Interest
Oak Ridges Moraine
Protected areas established in 1962
1962 establishments in Ontario